Frodo Baggins is a fictional character in J. R. R. Tolkien's writings, and one of the protagonists in The Lord of the Rings. Frodo is a hobbit of the Shire who inherits the One Ring from his cousin Bilbo Baggins, described familiarly as "uncle", and undertakes the quest to destroy it in the fires of Mount Doom in Mordor. He is mentioned in Tolkien's posthumously published works, The Silmarillion and Unfinished Tales. 

Frodo is repeatedly wounded during the quest, and becomes increasingly burdened by the Ring as it nears Mordor. He changes, too, growing in understanding and compassion, and avoiding violence. On his return to the Shire, he is unable to settle back into ordinary life; two years after the Ring's destruction, he is allowed to take ship to the earthly paradise of Valinor.

Frodo's name comes from the Old English name Fróda, meaning "wise by experience". Commentators have written that he combines courage, selflessness, and fidelity, and that as a good character, he seems unexciting but grows through his quest, an unheroic person who reaches heroic stature.

Internal history

Background

Frodo is introduced in The Lord of the Rings as Bilbo Baggins's cousin and adoptive heir. Frodo's parents Drogo Baggins and Primula Brandybuck had been killed in a boating accident when Frodo was twelve; Frodo spent the next nine years living with his maternal family, the Brandybucks in Brandy Hall. At the age of twenty-one  he was adopted by Bilbo, who brought him to live at his home, Bag End. He and Bilbo shared the same birthday, the 22nd of September. Bilbo introduced Frodo to the Elvish languages, and they often went on long walking trips together.

The Fellowship of the Ring

Frodo came of age as Bilbo left the Shire. Frodo inherited Bag End and Bilbo's ring. Gandalf, uncertain about the origin of the ring, warned Frodo to avoid using it and to keep it secret. Frodo kept it hidden for the next seventeen years, and it gave him the same longevity it had given Bilbo. Gandalf returned to tell him that it was the One Ring of the Dark Lord Sauron, who was seeking to recover and use it to conquer Middle-earth.

Realizing that he was a danger to the Shire as long as he remained there, Frodo decided to take the Ring to Rivendell, home of Elrond, a mighty Elf-lord. He left with three companions: his gardener Samwise Gamgee and his cousins Merry Brandybuck and Pippin Took. They were just in time, for Sauron's most powerful servants, the Nine Nazgûl, had entered the Shire as Black Riders, looking for the Ring. They followed Frodo's trail, nearly intercepting him.

The hobbits escaped into the Old Forest. They were waylaid by the magic of Old Man Willow, but rescued by Tom Bombadil, who gave them shelter and guidance. They were caught in fog on the Barrow Downs by a barrow-wight and put under a spell. Frodo broke free, attacked the barrow-wight and summoned Bombadil, who again rescued the hobbits and set them on their way.

At the Prancing Pony inn, Frodo received a delayed letter from Gandalf, and met a man calling himself Strider, a Ranger; his real name was Aragorn. The One Ring slipped onto Frodo's finger in the inn's common room, turning him invisible. This attracted the Nazgûl, who ransacked the hobbits' empty rooms in the night. Strider led the group through the marshes.

While encamped on Weathertop, they were attacked by five Nazgûl. The leader, the Witch-king of Angmar, stabbed Frodo with a Morgul-blade, the wound threatening to turn him into a wraith under the Nazgûl's control. Reaching Rivendell, he was healed by Elrond.

The Council of Elrond resolved to destroy the Ring by casting it into Mount Doom in Mordor, Sauron's realm. Frodo, realizing that he was destined for this task, stepped forward to be the Ring-bearer. A Fellowship of nine companions was formed to assist him: the hobbits, Gandalf, Aragorn, the dwarf Gimli, the elf Legolas, and Boromir, a man of Gondor. Bilbo, living in Rivendell, gave Frodo his sword Sting and a coat of Dwarf mail made of mithril. The company, unable to cross the Misty Mountains by a pass, entered the mines of Moria. Frodo was stabbed by an Orc with a spear, but his mithril mail-shirt saved his life. Gandalf was killed battling a Balrog. Aragorn led them out to Lothlórien. There Galadriel gave Frodo an Elven cloak and a phial carrying the Light of Eärendil to aid him on his quest.

The Fellowship travelled by boat down the Anduin River and reach the lawn of Parth Galen, just above the impassable falls of Rauros. There, Boromir, succumbing to the lure of the Ring, tried to take it by force. Frodo escaped by putting it on. This broke the Fellowship; the company was scattered by invading Orcs. Frodo chose to continue the quest alone, but Sam followed him.

The Two Towers

Frodo and Sam made their way through the wilds, followed by the creature Gollum, who had been tracking them, seeking to reclaim the Ring, which he had lost to Bilbo (as portrayed in The Hobbit). Gollum attacked the hobbits, but Frodo subdued him with Sting. He took pity on Gollum and spared his life, making him promise to guide them through the dead marshes to the Black Gate. They found the gate impassable; Gollum told them of "another way" into Mordor, and Frodo, over Sam's objections, let him lead them south into Ithilien. There they met Faramir, younger brother of Boromir, who took them to a hidden cave. Frodo allowed Gollum to be captured by Faramir, saving Gollum's life but leaving him feeling betrayed. Faramir provisioned the hobbits and sent them on their way, warning Frodo to beware of Gollum's treachery.

They passed Minas Morgul, where the pull of the Ring became overwhelming, and climbed the Endless Stair to cross into Mordor. At the top they entered a tunnel, not knowing it was the home of the giant spider Shelob. Gollum hoped to deliver the hobbits to her and retake the Ring after she had killed them. Shelob stung Frodo, rendering him unconscious, but Sam drove her off with Sting and the Phial of Galadriel. Believing that Frodo was dead, Sam took the Ring and continued the quest. Soon, however, he overheard Orcs taking Frodo for questioning, saying that he was still alive.

The Return of the King

Sam rescued Frodo and returned the Ring. Dressed in scavenged Orc-armour, they set off, trailed by Gollum. At Mount Doom, Frodo entered the chasm where Sauron had forged the Ring. Here Frodo lost the will to destroy the Ring, and put it on, claiming it for himself. Gollum attacked the invisible Frodo, biting off his finger and reclaiming the Ring. As he danced in elation, Gollum fell with the Ring into the fiery Cracks of Doom. The Ring was destroyed, and with it Sauron's power. Frodo and Sam were rescued by Great Eagles as Mount Doom erupted, destroying Mordor.

After Aragorn's coronation, the four hobbits returned home. They found that the fallen wizard Saruman and his agents had taken over the Shire and started to industrialize it. Frodo and his companions led a rebellion and defeated the intruders. Even after Saruman attempted to stab Frodo, Frodo let him go, only for Saruman to be killed by his henchman Gríma Wormtongue. The hobbits restored the Shire to its prior state of peace and goodwill. While successful in his quest, Frodo never recovered from the physical and emotional wounds he suffered on the quest. After two years, Frodo and Bilbo as Ring-bearers were granted passage to Valinor.

Other works

"The Sea-Bell" was published in Tolkien's 1962 collection of verse The Adventures of Tom Bombadil with the sub-title Frodos Dreme. Tolkien suggests that this enigmatic narrative poem represents the despairing dreams that visited Frodo in the Shire in the years following the destruction of the Ring. It relates the unnamed speaker's journey to a mysterious land across the sea, where he tries but fails to make contact with the people who dwell there. He descends into despair and near-madness, eventually returning to his own country, to find himself utterly alienated from those he once knew.

"Frodo the halfling" is mentioned briefly at the end of The Silmarillion, as "alone with his servant he passed through peril and darkness" and "cast the Great Ring of Power" into the fire.

In the poem Bilbo's Last Song, Frodo is at the Grey Havens at the farthest west of Middle-earth, about to leave the mortal world on an elven-ship to Valinor.

"The Hunt for the Ring" in Unfinished Tales describes how the Black Riders travelled to Isengard and the Shire in search of the One Ring, purportedly "according to the account that Gandalf gave to Frodo". It is one of several mentions of Frodo in the book.

Family tree

The Tolkien scholar Jason Fisher notes that Tolkien stated that hobbits were extremely "clannish" and had a strong "predilections for genealogy". Accordingly, Tolkien's decision to include Frodo's family tree in Lord of the Rings gives the book, in Fisher's view, a strongly "hobbitish perspective". The tree also, he notes, serves to show Frodo's and Bilbo's connections and familial characteristics. Frodo's family tree is as follows:

Concept and creation

Frodo did not appear until the third draft of A Long-Expected Party (the first chapter of The Lord of the Rings), when he was named Bingo, son of Bilbo Baggins and Primula Brandybuck. In the fourth draft, he was renamed Bingo Bolger-Baggins, son of Rollo Bolger and Primula Brandybuck. Tolkien did not change the name to Frodo until the third phase of writing, when much of the narrative, as far as the hobbits' arrival in Rivendell, had already taken shape. Prior to this, the name "Frodo" had been used for the character who eventually became Pippin Took. In drafts of the final chapters, published as Sauron Defeated, Gandalf names Frodo Bronwe athan Harthad ("Endurance Beyond Hope"), after the destruction of the Ring. Tolkien states that Frodo's name in Westron was Maura Labingi.

Interpretations

Name and origins

Frodo is the only prominent hobbit whose name is not explained in Tolkien's Appendices to The Lord of the Rings. In a letter Tolkien states that it is the Old English name Fróda, connected to fród, "wise by experience". The Tolkien scholar Tom Shippey suggests that the choice of name is significant: not, in Tolkien's phrase, one of the many "names that had no meaning at all in [the hobbits'] daily language". Instead, he notes, the Old Norse name Fróði is mentioned in Beowulf as the minor character Fróda. Fróði was, he writes, said by Saxo Grammaticus and Snorri Sturluson to be a peaceful ruler at the time of Christ, his time being named the Fróða-frið, the peace of Fróði. This was created by his magic mill, worked by two female giants, that could churn out peace and gold. He makes the giants work all day long at this task, until they rebel and grind out an army instead, which kills him and takes over, making the giants grind salt until the sea is full of it. The name Fróði is forgotten. Clearly, Shippey observes, evil is impossible to cure; and Frodo too is a "peacemaker, indeed in the end a pacifist". And, he writes, as Frodo gains experience through the quest, he also gains wisdom, matching the meaning of his name.

Character

Michael Stanton, writing in the J.R.R. Tolkien Encyclopedia, describes Frodo's character as combining "courage, selflessness, and fidelity", attributes that make Frodo ideal as a Ring-bearer. He lacks Sam's simple sturdiness, Merry and Pippin's clowning, and the psychopathology of Gollum, writes Stanton, bearing out the saying that good is less exciting than evil; but Frodo grows through his quest, becoming "ennobled" by it, to the extent that returning to the Shire feels in Frodo's words "like falling asleep again".

Christ figure

Tolkien was a devout Catholic, and wrote in his private letters that his Middle-earth stories were Christian. Scholars including Peter Kreeft, Paul E. Kerry, and Joseph Pearce state that there is no one complete, concrete, visible Christ figure in The Lord of the Rings, but Frodo serves as the priestly aspect of Christ, alongside Gandalf as prophet and Aragorn as King, together making up the threefold office of the Messiah.

Tragic hero

The Tolkien scholar Jane Chance quotes Randel Helms's view that in both The Hobbit and Lord of the Rings, "a most unheroic hobbit [Bilbo, Frodo] achieves heroic stature" in a quest romance. Chance writes that Frodo grows from seeing the threat as external, such as from the Black Riders, to internal, whether within the Fellowship, as shown by Boromir's attempt on the Ring, or within himself, as he struggles against the controlling power of the Ring.

The Tolkien scholar Verlyn Flieger summarizes Frodo's role in Lord of the Rings: "The greatest hero of all, Frodo Baggins, is also the most tragic. He comes to the end of his story bereft of the Ring, denied in his home Shire the recognition he deserves, and unable to continue his life as it was before his terrible adventure."

Providence

The Tolkien critic Paul H. Kocher discusses the role of providence, in the form of the intentions of the angel-like Valar or of the creator Eru Ilúvatar, in Bilbo's finding of the Ring and Frodo's bearing of it; as Gandalf says, Frodo was "meant" to have it, though it remains his choice to co-operate with this purpose.

Adaptations

Frodo appears in adaptations of The Lord of the Rings for radio, cinema, and stage. In Ralph Bakshi's 1978 animated version, Frodo was voiced by Christopher Guard. In the 1980 Rankin/Bass animated version of The Return of the King, made for television, the character was voiced by Orson Bean, who had previously played Bilbo in the same company's adaptation of The Hobbit. In the "massive" 1981 BBC radio serial of The Lord of the Rings, Frodo is played by Ian Holm, who later played Bilbo in Peter Jackson's film adaptation of The Lord of the Rings. In Leningrad Television's two-part 1991 teleplay Khraniteli (Keepers [of the Ring]), Frodo was played by Valery Dyachenko, while in the Finnish broadcaster Yle's 1993 television miniseries Hobitit, the role is played by Taneli Mäkelä.

In The Lord of the Rings film trilogy (2001–2003) directed by Peter Jackson, Frodo is played by the American actor Elijah Wood. Dan Timmons writes in the Mythopoeic Society's Tolkien on Film that the themes and internal logic of the Jackson films are undermined by the portrayal of Frodo, which he considers a weakening of Tolkien's original. 
The film critic Roger Ebert writes that he missed the depth of characterisation he felt in the book, Frodo doing little but watching other characters decide his fate "and occasionally gazing significantly upon the Ring". Peter Travers of Rolling Stone, however, wrote that Wood played the role with "soulful conviction", and that his portrayal matured as the story progressed. Wood reprised the role in a brief appearance in The Hobbit: An Unexpected Journey.

On stage, Frodo was portrayed by James Loye in the three-hour stage production of The Lord of the Rings, which opened in Toronto in 2006, and was brought to London in 2007. Frodo was portrayed by Joe Sofranko in the Cincinnati productions of The Fellowship of the Ring (2001), The Two Towers (2002), and The Return of the King (2003) for Clear Stage Cincinnati.

See also

Notes

References

Primary
This list identifies each item's location in Tolkien's writings.

Secondary

Sources
 
 
 
 
 
 
 
 

Adventure film characters
Bearers of the One Ring
Fictional biographers
Literary characters introduced in 1954
The Lord of the Rings characters
Middle-earth Hobbits
Orphan characters in literature
Christ figures in fiction